James McHugh Construction Co. is an American construction management and structural engineering firm based in Chicago, Illinois. As of 2019, McHugh was the 160th-largest contractor in the United States as tabulated by Engineering News-Record. McHugh is best known for its high-rise work in Chicago, including the St. Regis Chicago, NEMA, Aqua, Water Tower Place, Marina City, and Trump International Hotel and Tower.

History
McHugh was founded in 1897 by James D. McHugh, an Irish bricklayer from the South Side of Chicago. By the mid-1920s, McHugh had established itself as a general contractor specializing in elaborate masonry work. 

During the Great Depression, McHugh continued to grow through projects funded by the Public Works Administration. McHugh began sending crews across the country for heavy construction work, including water treatment systems and transportation tunnels. The postwar era of the 1940s and 1950s saw a resurgence of the market for institutional facilities and public works structures as Chicago struggled to keep pace with its booming population. In response to this demand, McHugh built additions to Cook County Hospital and a residence hall for Rush-Presbyterian St. Luke's Medical Center in 1955.

During the 1950s, McHugh continued to centralize and grow in Chicago. Marina City was one of their next large projects. For this project, McHugh pioneered the use of fiberglass concrete forms that are still used for curved concrete construction. The project, the world's tallest reinforced concrete structure at the time, also marked the first use of the climbing crane, which paved the way for speedier, more efficient high-rise construction.

When a change in ownership occurred in the mid-1970s, the McHughs chose to sell a portion of the company to the employees, which predated the employee stock option trend by decades.  Employees still own part of the company today.

After the passing of her father in August 2016, the founder's great grand daughter, Patty McHugh, became chairwoman of the firm.

Expansion
Though many projects are located in the Chicago area today, McHugh was the first American contractor to open an office in Moscow after the revolutions of 1989 and today has projects around the country. Between 1991 and 1999, McHugh had built for local and non-Russian clients including Dialog Bank, ABC News, Boeing Co. and Morgan Stanley.  In recent years, in addition to Chicago, the company has also completed several projects around the country in locations including Nashville, St. Louis, Minneapolis, and South Florida.

Notable projects
McHugh has constructed a variety of notable projects, largely concentrated in the Chicago metropolitan area:
 St. Regis Chicago – third-tallest building in Chicago
NEMA – tenth-tallest building in Chicago
Aqua – twelfth-tallest building in Chicago
Park Tower – fifteenth-tallest building in Chicago
United Center master plan
Fifth Third Arena
Goodman Theatre
 Civic Opera House renovation
 McCormick Place expansion
 Chicago Board of Trade expansion
 Arlington Park
 Peggy Notebaert Nature Museum
 Virgin Hotels Chicago
 Advocate Center, a training facility for the Chicago Bulls
 The Blackstone Hotel renovation

References

Companies based in Chicago
Construction and civil engineering companies of the United States
Privately held companies based in Illinois
Construction and civil engineering companies established in 1897
1897 establishments in Illinois